The men's cross-country competition of the cycling events at the 2011 Pan American Games was held on October 15 at the Pan American Mountain Bike Circuit in Tapalpa. The defending Pan American Games champion is Adam Craig of the United States, while the defending Pan American Championship, champion is Hector Paez of Colombia.

Schedule
All times are Central Standard Time (UTC-6).

Results
21 competitors from 12 countries are scheduled to compete.

Did not finish

Disqualified

Did not start

References

Cycling at the 2011 Pan American Games
Mountain biking at the Pan American Games
2011 in mountain biking